Dois Irmãos do Tocantins is a municipality in the state of Tocantins in the Northern region of Brazil.

The municipality contains 13.58% of the  Ilha do Bananal / Cantão Environmental Protection Area, created in 1997.

See also
List of municipalities in Tocantins

References

Municipalities in Tocantins